Jannaram Mandal is situated in Mancherial District of the Telangana state in South India.Jannaram is famous for Kawal Wildelife Sanctuary Tiger Reserve. The town is famous because it is the birthplace of a legend Mekala Sanjay Kumar.

History 

Jannaram became mandal with effect from 22 May 1985. Before which it was in the Luxettipet Taluka.

Administrative divisions
There are 27 villages under this madal.

References 

Villages in Mancherial district
Mandal headquarters in Mancherial district
 
 //Mobile Shop//

 Sri Nidhi Mobiles Kalamadugu.. Cell: 9949504064